New Zealand's Got Talent was a New Zealand reality television show, based on the original UK series, to find new talent. The third and final series began airing on TV One from 15 September 2013. Host Tāmati Coffey returned to the show, along with judges Jason Kerrison and Rachel Hunter and key sponsor Toyota New Zealand. Cris Judd also joined the judging panel, replacing Ali Campbell. The series screened at 7.30pm on Sunday evenings.

The series was won by 22-year-old singer Renee Maurice from Wellington, who performed "And I Am Telling You I'm Not Going". Maurice had previously made it to the bootcamp round of the first New Zealand series of The X Factor. Christchurch dance duo Silhouette was the runner-up, with 14-year-old singer-songwriter Jenny Mitchell from Gore in third place. Unlike 2012 winner Clara van Wel, Maurice was not given a recording contract, after Sony opted not to sign her. Maurice did, however, still receive the prize of a new car and $80,000 cash.

Background 

In November 2012, TVNZ confirmed the show would return for a third series in 2013. In July 2013, funding agency NZ On Air confirmed that it would give the series $800,000 in production funding, a 50% reduction from the 2012 series funding.

Host and judges 

In December 2012, series two host Tāmati Coffey announced his plans to tour Europe for six months in early 2013, expressing his intention to return to New Zealand to present the 2013 series. In June 2013 he was confirmed as returning as series host. In April, TVNZ confirmed Opshop frontman Jason Kerrison would return as a judge. In May, TVNZ confirmed that American choreographer Cris Judd would join the judging panel and that Rachel Hunter would return to the judging panel for 2013.

Auditions
The first call for auditions was made in November 2012. Contestants could enter in one of three ways: online, via post, or in person at an open audition venue as part of the Toyota Talent Tour. From late April to early June 2013, the show's producers toured around New Zealand towns and cities with the Toyota Talent Tour and held non-televised open auditions. The top applicants then progressed to the judges' auditions.

The following list contains all of the cities, venues and dates of the Toyota Talent Tour.

Judges auditions 

The judges auditions took place in Dunedin at the Regent Theatre on 14 and 15 July, in Auckland at the City Impact Church on 25 and 27 July and in Wellington at the St James Theatre on 10 and 11 August. The first episode aired on 15 September 2013, running for 90 minutes. After the judges' auditions, the successful contestants will be further reduced down to a group of 30 for the semi-finals.

Semi-finals

There are six semi-finals, with the first episode broadcast on 10 October. The semi-finals are pre-recorded the Thursday before broadcast at the City Impact Church in Albany, Auckland.  The winners of each week's semi-final were revealed at the beginning of the next week's episode.

Tip Top Natural Talent Search 

In addition to 30 semi-finalists, one wildcard entry will be chosen by a public competition. The Tip Top Natural Talent Search competition is open to any act. Acts upload a video audition and are voted on by the public. The top five acts were revealed in semi-final four, with the winner selected by the judges and announced in semi-final five. The five top acts were: The Pack (dance trio), The Black Trio (singing trio), Troublemakers Dance Crew (dance group), Shane Brown (singer) and APD Bhangra Group (dance group).

Semi-finalists

Semi-final summary

First Semi-Final, Week 1 (20 October)

Second Semi-Final, Week 2 (27 October) 
 Guest performer: Clara van Wel – "Wait For Me"

Third Semi-Final, Week 3 (3 November) 
 Guest performer: Ezra Vine "Celeste"

Fourth Semi-Final, Week 4 (10 November)

Fifth Semi-Final, Week 5 (17 November) 

Guest performer: Sol3 Mio

Sixth Semi-Final, Week 6 (24 November) 

Guest performer: Olly Murs – "Dear Darlin'"

 Judge Rachel Hunter was unable to choose between IDentity and Sam Francks, declaring she wanted both acts to go through. This decision was accepted.

Grand Final, Week 7 (1 – 8 December) 

The two-hour grand final was broadcast on 1 December with the results show on 8 December.
 Guest performers:
 The Babysitters Circus feat. Jason Kerrison – "Giving Love"
 Criss Judd dance performance – "When I Was Your Man"
 ENZSO feat. Jason Kerrison – "Poor Boy"
 Contestant performances:
 Jenny, Renee and Silhouette – "Next to Me"
 Rejected auditionees medley

References

External links 
 Official site
 New Zealand's Got Talent on Facebook

2013 in New Zealand television
2013 New Zealand television seasons